John Trobaugh (born 1968) in Lansing, Michigan is an American artist specializing in photography and based in Birmingham, Alabama. Trobaugh received his BFA in 1996 with honors from University of Alabama at Birmingham and went on to study photography at the School of Visual Arts. In 2003 he received his Master of Fine Arts from the University of Alabama in Tuscaloosa, Alabama.

His photography has been published in Art Papers, selected as the cover artist. He has also been published in The Chronicle of Higher Education, NY Arts Magazine, The Washington Post and The Advocate as well as The Birmingham News and World of Wonder, among many others.

While teaching at Sheldon State in Tuscaloosa Alabama, Trobaugh's work was censored before a planned exhibition. The case has yet to be resolved but gained national attention due to censorship issues. He was  forbidden to discuss this censorship as part of his art appreciation class. Trobaugh later resigned his post.

Richard Meyer, chair of the art department at The University of Southern California in Los Angeles, California, spoke about Trobaugh's work at various national conferences about censorship. Trobaugh was also presented in The Smithsonian National Gallery and is the author of several articles including Art Papers.

Work
In 2005, Space One Eleven exhibited Trobaugh's work alongside Karen Graffeo for"In This Place". M. K. Matalon organized this exhibition to investigate place and location in relationship to contemporary Southern issues.

Trobaugh's work was selected to be part of Patterns of Nature in Denver, Colorado.

Trobaugh was included in "Politics, Politics: Nine Artists Explore the Political Landscape" curated by Anne Arrasmith and Peter Prinz of Space One Eleven. This exhibition was funded by the Andy Warhol Foundation for the Visual Arts and included Pinky Bass, Clayton Colvin, Peggy Dobbins, Randy Gachet, binx Newton, Arthur Price, Paul Ware, and Stan Woodard.

Trobaugh was a presenter for Photography in the Digital Age by The Society For Photographic Education South Central Regional Conference, 2003. This meeting took place at the University of Alabama at Birmingham and Birmingham Museum of Art in Birmingham, Alabama

In 2009, Trobaugh moved to Worcester, Massachusetts with his husband and son. Trobaugh became involved in Worcester civic life first through Worcester Pride, a local LGBTQ+ organization, then by running for school committee. Trobaugh works in the Diversity and Inclusion Office at the University of Massachusetts Medical School.

Books
 In Potentially Harmful: The Art of American Censorship, Trobaugh's work was shown alongside Dread Scott, Robert Mapplethorpe, Sue Coe, Lynda Benglis, Andres Serrano, Karen Finley, Alma Lopez, John Jota Leaos, Benita Carr, Anita Steckel, Renee Cox, Gayla Lemke, Marilyn Zimmerman, John Sims, The Critical Art Ensemble, Eric Fischl, Tom Forsythe, Nancy Worthington, David Avalos, Scott Kessler, Louis Hock and Elizabeth Sisco. This project was funded by a major grant from The Andy Warhol Foundation for the Visual Arts with considerable local support from the Atlanta Bureau of Cultural Affairs, and the Georgia State University College of Arts and Sciences Visiting Artists and Scholars Fund, the College of Law, the Ethics Center, Women's Studies, African American Studies, the department of communications and additional private donors.

Quotes
 Photographs by John Trobaugh were removed from display for “inappropriate” content at an exhibition at Shelton State Community College in Tuscaloosa, Alabama. The photographs portray Ken and G.I. Joe posed in romantic (though not sexually explicit) couplings. this decision involved the National Coalition Against Censorship. -Queer Caucus for Art
 The censoring of my work from this faculty exhibition served to illustrate this point because administrators “loved” the images, yet the president of the college removed the whole series. People ask why would I want to show my work in the South anyway? I was raised here, the fantasy world was created here, and the images are made or based in the South. Why shouldn't the South see what the South created? -John Trobaugh 
 His most recent series, called Double Duty, are photographs using the 12" dolls to make social commentary," the text says. "Trobaugh's photographs uncannily portray human likeness and gesture." True. In fact, for a second, we thought someone had found and posted photos we took in the '70s. Just for a second. -Stephen Saban of The WOW Report
 Actually I like Trobaugh's photos more than David Leventhal. Nothing is more subjective than art and nothing is more common in art than homoeroticism. -Stephen Smith, Birmingham Free Press, 2004

Notes

External links
 National Coalition Against Censorship Winter 2002–2003 Example of Trobaugh's work
 SITO Examples of Trobaugh's work
 After the Culture Wars Richard Meyer, Art Papers This became a 150-page catalog documenting the exhibition in 2006
 Trobaugh Photos Banned in Alabama Stephen Smith, Birmingham Free Press 2004

Living people
American portrait photographers
Photographers from Michigan
Censorship in the arts
Photography controversies
1968 births
Artists from Lansing, Michigan
Photographers from Alabama